Sri Satyatma Tirtha (born 8 March 1973), is an Indian Hindu philosopher, guru, scholar, spiritual leader, saint and the present pontiff of Uttaradi Math. He is the 42nd pontiff of Uttaradi Math since Madhvacharya, the chief proponent and the one who rejuvenated the Dvaita philosophy (Tattvavada). Satyatma Tirtha founded Vishwa Madhwa Maha Parishat, a non-profit, religious and social organization in 1998.

Early life
He was born in a prominent family of scholars on 8 March 1973 to Pandit Rangacharya Guttal and K.S. Rukmabai in Mumbai, Maharashtra, India and was named Sarvajna (Sarvajnacharya). Pandit Rangacharya is the pūrvāśrama (previous to sannyāsa order) son of Shri Satyapramoda Tīrtha Swamiji.

Sannyasa
Sarvajna became a sannyāsi at the age of 23, directly from brahmacharya at Raghūttama Tīrtha Brundāvana, Tirukoilur (in Tamil Nadu) in the presence of Shri Satyapramoda Tīrtha Swamiji on 24 April 1996 and was renamed as Satyātma Tīrtha. He is also known as Abhinava Raghūttama Tīrtharu since he received sannyasa directly from brahmacharya. Shri Satyātma Tīrtha Swamiji is only the second pontiff of Uttaradi Math to receive sannyāsa from brahmacharya.

Social responsibility
Shri Satyatma Tirtha, through Uttaradi Math, encouraged water harvesting and management expert, the waterman of India and  Ramon Magsaysay Award winner Rajendra Singh to give lecture on water conservation and other topics. Through Uttaradi Math and jointly with Vishwa Madhwa Maha Parishat, he gives needy students about ₹5 lakhs (about US$10,000) each year.

Flood relief
He has supplied relief materials to flood victims of Bellary, Bijapur, Raichur and Bagalkot districts during 2009 floods and also took measures to construct 100 low cost houses to those who lost houses in the flood. He has also adopted a rural village in Raichur, Karnataka for integrated development of the village. He is reportedly trying to redefine the role of religious "math" in modern-day society, so that present day "math" should try to get rid of evils of modern society.

Spiritual discourses
His spiritual discourses (pravacana) attract large gatherings, mainly from followers of Madhvacharya and he specialises in talks on Vedic subjects. He has given spiritual discourses at several places like Bangalore, Gulbarga, Malkheda, Udupi, Rajahmundry, Hyderabad (India), Pune, Raichur, Dharwad and Chennai. He has also conducted personality development programmes and has written several books on topics like personality development, religion and philosophy. Satyatma Tirtha, as the present head of Uttaradi Matha, has also encouraged other authors to write books on religious experiences.
He has given discourses in various languages including Kannada, Telugu, Hindi, Tamil, and Marathi.

Books based on his discourses

Chaturmasya deeksha
Generally "Parivrajakas" (Dandi Swamis) are to be on the move as the word "Vraja" indicates but during the Chaturmasa period they have to stay-put in one place. Moving out either for yatra or for other reasons is violation of Shastras and Yati Dharma. During this season of Chaturmasya, the wandering mendicants (Yatis) takes Chaturmasya deeksha, stay at a suitable place and become fully engrossed in contemplation of God. In 2017, Satyatma Tirtha spent his Chaturmasya deeksha in Palamoor in Telangana from (18 July 2017 – 6 September 2017).

See also
 Dvaita Vedanta
 Works of Madhvacharya
 Works of Jayatirtha
 Uttaradi Matha

References

Bibliography

External links 

 Official website of Uttaradi Math
 Dheemahi (English)

Dvaita Vedanta
Hindu philosophers and theologians
20th-century Indian philosophers
Indian Hindu saints
Madhva religious leaders
Dvaitin philosophers
Vaishnavism
Bhakti movement
Living people
Uttaradi Math
Hindu activists
20th-century Hindu religious leaders
21st-century Hindu religious leaders
1973 births